The Asian Men's U20 Volleyball Championship is an international volleyball competition in Asia and Oceania contested by the under 20 men's national teams of the members of Asian Volleyball Confederation (AVC), the sport's continent governing body. Tournaments have been awarded every two years since 1980. The top two teams qualified for the FIVB Volleyball Men's U21 World Championship. The current champion is Iran, which won its seventh title at the 2022 tournament. 

The 20 Asian Championship tournaments have been won by four different national teams: Iran have won seven times. South Korea, with six title; China, with four titles; and Japan, with three titles.

The 2022 Asian Championship took place in Riffa, Bahrain.

Result summary

Teams reaching the top four

Champions by region

Hosts

Medal summary

Participating nations
Legend
 – Champions
 – Runners-up
 – Third place
 – Fourth place
 – Did not enter / Did not qualify
 – Hosts
Q – Qualified for the forthcoming tournament

Debut of teams

Awards

Most Valuable Player

Best Opposite Spiker

Best Outside Spikers

Best Middle Blockers

Best Setter

Best Libero

Former awards

Best Scorer

Best Spiker

Best Server

Best Blocker

Best Receiver

Best Digger

See also

 Asian Women's U19 Volleyball Championship
 Asian Men's Volleyball Championship
 Volleyball at the Asian Games
 AVC Cup for Men
 Asian Men's U23 Volleyball Championship
 Asian Boys' U18 Volleyball Championship

References 
 asianvolleyball.org

External links
 Official AVC website

 
U20

V
International volleyball competitions
International men's volleyball competitions
Youth volleyball
Volleyball competitions in Asia
Biennial sporting events
Asian Volleyball Confederation competitions
Asian youth sports competitions